Willemina Ogterop (1881–1974) was a Dutch-American artist and stained glass window designer of almost 500 windows in 80 locations.

Biography

Ogterop was born in Maastricht in the Netherlands in 1881. After migrating to California in 1918 with her husband and four children, she worked in the Cummings Art Glass Studio in San Francisco as their principal designer from 1928 to 1953, designing nearly 500 stained glass windows, and creating more than 200 works of art in other media.

There are more than 80 venues, primarily Christian churches, in six states of the US which contain her stained glass works; however, the great majority of her windows are in 40 cities and towns in California, in addition to a total of 9 churches in the states of Nevada, Washington, Oklahoma, Iowa, and Louisiana. She donated three works of art to India, two of which can be found on public display: the woodcarving "Satyagraha" in the National Gandhi Museum in New Delhi and a stained glass plaque depicting a poem in Sanskrit by the Bengali poet Rabindranath Tagore, which is in the Tagore Museum at Visva Bharati University, Santiniketan, Bolpur, West Bengal, India.  The "Nehru Window" - honoring India's first prime minister, Jawaharlal Nehru - and delivered to him in 1946 by his sister, Mrs. Pandit, has never been located.

In addition to her prodigious professional art work, she created hundreds of oil and water color paintings, ink, pencil and chalk drawings and woodcarvings - many of which remain today, treasured by her grand and great-grandchildren. Her earliest album of drawings was done in 1892 at the age of 11. She attended an art academy and a teacher training school in Amsterdam, before departing Holland, alone, at the age of 21 for South Africa.  She lived in South Africa from 1903 to 1905, traveled to East Africa, Ceylon and Bombay, and lived in Indonesia from 1905 to 1907, before returning to Holland. She kept detailed journals all her life, which form the basis of our extensive knowledge of her fascinating, adventurous and highly productive life.

Willemina Ogterop was a multiculturalist and internationalist who was active in many peace and humanitarian organizations.  She wrote her "Philosophy of Living" and felt that Buddhism was the most sensible and inclusive religion of all.

References

1881 births
1974 deaths
Dutch stained glass artists and manufacturers
Dutch women artists
Dutch emigrants to the United States
Artists from Maastricht
20th-century American women artists
American glass artists